James Hodson (5 September 1880 – 27 February 1938) was an English professional footballer who played as a full back in the Football League for Oldham Athletic, Bury and Brentford. He later managed Guildford United and Belgian club Royal Berchem Sport.

Playing career

Early years 
Hodson began his career in his native north west with Lancashire Combination club St Helens Recreation in 1900 and transferred to First Division club Bury in 1902. He was a reserve during Bury's 1902–03 FA Cup-winning campaign.

Oldham Athletic 
Hodson transferred to Oldham Athletic for a £15 fee and played in the club's very first Football League match in September 1907. He had a successful time with the club, winning promotion to the First Division in the 1909–10 season, reaching the FA Cup semi-finals in 1912–13 and finishing second in the First Division in 1914–15. The outbreak of the First World War in August 1914 saw competitive football suspended for the duration of the war after the close of the 1914–15 season, which brought Hodson's time with the Latics to an end. He made 252 league appearances and scored one goal during his time at Boundary Park.

First World War 
In the midst of the First World War, Hodson joined London Combination club West Ham United. He contributed to the Combination title win in his first season and made 49 appearances for the Hammers, the last of which coming in a 3–1 defeat to eventual 1918–19 champions Brentford on 28 December 1918. Hodson had a spell at Belfast & District League club Belfast Celtic in the second half of the club's title-winning 1918–19 season. He also made two Lancashire Senior Cup appearances for Southport late in the 1918–19 season.

Brentford 
Hodson transferred to Southern League First Division club Brentford in May 1919. He made 35 appearances and got another chance at League football in 1920, when the Bees were added to the new Third Division for the 1920–21 season. A week short of his 40th birthday, Hodson made his first Football League appearance since 1915 in Brentford's 3–0 defeat to Exeter City on 28 August 1920. He made 34 appearances during a dire season, after which the Bees had to apply for re-election. Hodson departed Brentford at the end of the campaign, after making 68 appearances for the club.

Guildford United 
Hodson dropped back into non-League football to sign for Southern League English Section club Guildford United on 7 May 1921.

Management and coaching career 
Hodson combined his playing duties at Guildford United with that of the club's manager. After retiring as a player, Hodson moved to Belgium to take over as manager of First Division club Royal Berchem Sport in 1922. He managed the club to three mid-table finishes before departing at the end of the 1924–25 season.

Career statistics

Honours 
Oldham Athletic
 Lancashire Senior Cup: 1907–08
West Ham United
 London Combination: 1916–17
Belfast Celtic
 Belfast & District League: 1918–19

References

1880 births
English footballers
People from Horwich
Bury F.C. players
Brentford F.C. players
English Football League players
Southern Football League players
Oldham Athletic A.F.C. players
Association football fullbacks
West Ham United F.C. players
Belfast Celtic F.C. players
Guildford City F.C. players
Guildford City F.C. managers
English expatriate football managers
English expatriate sportspeople in Belgium
K. Berchem Sport managers
Southern Football League managers
1938 deaths
English expatriate sportspeople in the Netherlands
Southport F.C. wartime guest players